Dameshkaft-e Kalat (also Romanized as Dameshkaft-e Kalāt; also known as Dameshkaft) is a village in Doshman Ziari Rural District, in the Central District of Kohgiluyeh County, Kohgiluyeh and Boyer-Ahmad Province, Iran. At the 2006 census, its population was 151, in 30 families.

References 

Populated places in Kohgiluyeh County